Lee John Harding (born 19 February 1937) is an Australian freelance photographer, who became a writer of science fiction novels and short stories.

Science fiction writing

Born in Colac, Victoria, and an enthusiastic fan of science fiction, Harding was among the founding members of the Melbourne Science Fiction Club.  Other members of the club were Race Mathews, Bertram Chandler, Bob McCubbin, Merv Binns and Dick Jenssen.

Harding's first published work appeared in the Sydney photographic magazine PHOTO DIGEST in 1958: a photographic coverage of the filming of Nevil Shute's novel ON THE BEACH in Melbourne and Frankston locations, accompanied by a personal written record of his adventures there. This led to a request for a regular monthly column for the magazine on 35mm photography, and a subsequent photographic and written coverage of the filming of THE SUNDOWNERS, in Cooma, NSW.

In 1961 Harding's first published short story, Displaced Person, was published in Science Fantasy. He continued to write and submit stories to a range of magazines, including New Worlds, Science Fantasy, and Science Fiction Adventures in the U.K. In 1966, John Bangsund started the Australian SF Review (ASFR) and he and Harding and John Foyster became editorial partners in producing this fanzine publication. In 1969 Harding then went on to write for the joint Australian/UK SF magazine Vision of Tomorrow, set up by Ron Graham, plus stories in U.S magazines Galaxy, If and Odyssey, and also Australian magazines, including the Melbourne SUN newspaper. These stories were widely translated and dramatised. He also wrote two 12 part science fiction serials for ABC Education Radio and dramatised an H.G. Wells story for the same programme.

From 1972 Harding switched from photography to writing full-time. He published four short PB novels in Cassel's (aust.) education series for reluctant readers : The Fallen Spaceman, Children of Atlantis, The Frozen Sky & Return to Tomorrow. The success of this series was beyond expectations: the time was right to introduce the genre more widely in Australia.  His first adult novel, A WORLD OF SHADOWS, followed  in 1976 (Robert Hale, London) and in the same year he edited the seminal Australian SF anthologies BEYOND TOMORROW and THE ALTERED I, with assistance from Rob Gerrand and Ursula K. Le Guin, and followed this with ROOMS OF PARADISE in 1978, which was also published in the U.S. and U.K. Several stories from the latter were also re-printed in the annual U.S. publication, THE YEAR'S BEST SF. Four SF novels followed, culminating in the ground-breaking classic DISPLACED PERSON, adapted from his earlier short story, and his winning the Children's Book of The Year Award in 1980 accelerated the acceptance of the "young adult" genre to Australian fiction. With HEARTSEASE, he finally moved away from science fiction with his first mainstream novel, also for the young adult market. Harding has also written short stories using the pseudonym, Harold G Nye.

Awards
 1970 - Ditmar Award Best Australian Science Fiction for Dancing Gerontius
 1972 - Ditmar Award Best Australian Fiction for Fallen Spaceman
 1978 - Alan Marshall Short Story Award for an unpublished manuscript Displaced Person
 1980 - Winner of the Australian Children's Book of the Year Award for Displaced Person
  2006 - Australian Science Fiction Foundation, Chandler Award in gratitude for his life's work.

He has also received three Fellowships from the Literature Board.

Bibliography

Novels
 The Fallen Spaceman (Cassell Australia, 1973) REVISED & republished in 1979 by Harper & Row 
 Children of Atlantis(Cassell Australia, 1974)
 A World of Shadows (Hale, 1975)
 The Frozen Sky (Cassell Australia, 1975)
 Return to Tomorrow (Cassell Australia, 1976)
 Future Sanctuary (Laser Books New York #41, Sept. 1976)
 The Weeping Sky (Cassell Australia, 1977)
 Displaced Person (Hyland House, Australia1979)[as Misplaced Persons (Harper & Row, May 1979)] minor revisions, Penguin (1981)
 The Web of Time (Cassell Australia, 1980) Novelisation of radio play 'Journey Into Time'
 Waiting for the End of the World (Hyland House, Australia 1983)
 Heartsease (HarperCollins, Australia 1997)

RADIO PLAYS

'Journey Into Time'  (SERIAL: Australian Broadcasting Commission, c1978)
'The Legend of New Earth' (SERIAL: Australian Broadcasting Commission, c1979)
'The Man Who Could Work Miracles (adaptation of H.G.Wells story Australian Broadcasting Commission,c.1980)

Short stories
 "Dancing Gerontius" in the collection: The Second Pacific Book of Science Fiction edited by John Baxter (Angus and Robertson, 1971)
 "Soul Survivors" in the collection: New Writings in SF-17 edited by John Carnell (Dobson, 1970)

Edited
 Beyond Tomorrow : an anthology of modern science fiction (Wren, 1975)
 The Altered I : an encounter with science fiction / by Ursula K. Le Guin and others (Norstrilia Press, 1976)
 Rooms of Paradise (Quartet Books, 1978)

Notes

References

 Oxford Companion to Australian Literature  Oxford 1985  pp 316–317  613
 The Encyclopedia of Science Fiction Orbit 1993  pp 541–542
A. Bertram Chandler Award 2006 presented to Lee Harding, by Bruce Gillespie Australian Science Fiction Foundation, Chandler Award Winners (Retrieved 17 September 2007)
Lee Harding - Brief Biography Perry Middlemiss (Retrieved 17 September 2007)
AustLit Biography (Retrieved 28 February 2008)

External links

Worlds of if magazine June 1971

20th-century Australian novelists
Australian male novelists
Australian photographers
Australian science fiction writers
Australian male short story writers
1937 births
Living people
20th-century Australian short story writers
People from Colac, Victoria
Writers from Victoria (Australia)
20th-century Australian male writers